Derek Edwards (c. 1943 – 27 January 2020) was an English professional rugby league footballer who played in the 1960s and 1970s.

Playing career

Club career
Born in Castleford, Edwards started his career with his hometown club Castleford during the 1960–61 season. He won his first trophy with the club in 1965, playing at full-back in Castleford's 4–0 victory over St. Helens in the inaugural BBC2 Floodlit Trophy final on Tuesday 14 December 1965. Castleford won the trophy again in the two following seasons, with Edwards playing in both games — a 7–2 victory over Swinton in the 1966 BBC2 Floodlit Trophy final on Tuesday 20 December 1966, and an 8–5 victory over Leigh in the 1967 BBC2 Floodlit Trophy final on Saturday 16 January 1968.

During the 1968–69 season, Edwards played full-back in Castleford's 11–22 defeat by Leeds in the 1968 Yorkshire Cup final on Saturday 19 October 1968. At the end of the season, Castleford won the 1969 Challenge Cup final, with Edwards playing full-back in a 11–6 victory over Salford on Saturday 17 May 1969. He also played in the 7–2 victory over Wigan in the 1970 Challenge Cup final on Saturday 9 May 1970 in the following season.

In his final season at the club, he played full-back in the 7–11 defeat by Hull Kingston Rovers in the 1971 Yorkshire Cup final on Saturday 21 August 1971.

Edwards did not play for Castleford during the 1972–73 season due to a dispute with the club. He was eventually sold to Leeds for a fee of £5,000 in December 1972. In the 1973–74 season, he was transferred to Keighley.

He played 21 games for Keighley during the 1974–75 season.

Representative honours

Edwards won caps for Great Britain while at Castleford in 1968 against France, in 1970 against Australia, and in 1971 against New Zealand (3 matches).

Edwards was selected for the Great Britain Squad while at Castleford for the 1968 Rugby League World Cup in Australia and New Zealand. However, along with Chris Young of Hull Kingston Rovers, he did not participate in any of the three matches.

References

External links
 Profile at thecastlefordtigers.co.uk

1940s births
2020 deaths
Rugby league players from Castleford
Rugby league fullbacks
English rugby league players
Castleford Tigers players
Doncaster R.L.F.C. coaches
Leeds Rhinos players
Keighley Cougars players
Yorkshire rugby league team players
Great Britain national rugby league team players